The Regional Committee for Cycling in Martinique (in French: Comité Régional Cycliste de Martinique) is the regional governing body of cycle racing in Martinique.

It is an associated member of COPACI, the Pan-American cycling confederation.

References

External links 
Official website

Cycle racing organizations
Cycle racing in Martinique
Sports governing bodies in France